Mariana Machado (born 12 November 2000) is a Portuguese middle-distance and cross country runner. She competed in the women's 3000 metres event at the 2021 European Athletics Indoor Championships. She is the daughter of Portuguese Olympic runner Albertina Machado.

Awards

References

External links
 

2000 births
Living people
Portuguese female middle-distance runners
Place of birth missing (living people)
Sportspeople from Braga
21st-century Portuguese women
World Athletics Championships athletes for Portugal